The Victa Airtourer is an all-metal light low-wing monoplane touring aircraft that was developed in Australia, and was manufactured in both Australia and New Zealand.

Design and development
The Airtourer was the winning design, submitted by Henry Millicer, the chief aerodynamicist of Australia's Government Aircraft Factories, in a competition organised by Britain's Royal Aero Club in 1953. A wooden prototype was constructed by a small group of enthusiasts (the Air Tourer Group of the Australian Ultra Light Aircraft Association) in the Melbourne suburb of Williamstown during the late 1950s. This prototype, registered VH-FMM (nicknamed Foxtrot Mickey Mouse) was first flown on 31 March 1959 by Flt. Lt.Randell Green at Moorabbin airport.

The Airtourer design is of cantilever low-wing monoplane configuration, with a fixed tricycle landing gear. It has interconnected ailerons and flaps, with both systems functioning as both ailerons and as flaps when operated. The nosewheel was steerable. Space was available for luggage (45 kg weight limit).

The prototype was demonstrated to aero clubs and flying schools as a possible replacement for existing training aircraft, mostly Tiger Moths and Chipmunks. After trial flights over Melbourne and then to the Latrobe Valley Airport development continued to the all-metal version. The all-metal prototype to production standard (VH-MVA) followed on 12 December 1961.

Interest was shown in the design by Mervyn Richardson, Chairman of Victa Ltd, which at that time was best known for making lawn mowers and light two-stroke engines. Richardson was interested in entering an aviation-related industry. During the period 1961 to 1966, Victa Ltd. undertook production of the all-metal Airtourer, building both 100 hp and 115 hp models. Victa production continued until 1966.

As the Australian Government had rejected Victa's appeals for tariff protection assistance, or for direct subsidies to keep the production lines open, the company chose to suspend production of the Airtourer in February 1966, by which time it had built 172 Airtourers. While the Aviation division initially remained open to spares support for existing aircraft and to continue development of the four-seat Aircruiser, the division was completely shut down on 20 January 1967.

The manufacturing rights to the Airtourer were purchased the following year by the maintenance firm Aero Engine Services Ltd (AESL) in New Zealand where further production of 115 hp and 150 hp models took place until 1973.

Henry Millicer had designed the Victa Aircruiser, a four-seater derivative design, powered by a 210 hp Continental O-360 engine, which was certificated in 1967.  AESL acquired the rights to the design in 1970 and it was used to form the basis of the CT/4 Airtrainer.

A total of 168 were completed or significantly completed by Victa in Sydney and a further 80 built by AESL in Hamilton NZ. Actually it would be correct to say that 170 serial numbers were issued by Victa and 80 by AESL.

Examination of the records show that some of the late serial numbers issued by Victa were completed in NZ and issued with a NZ serial number (starting at 501). In addition, some of the Victa-built aircraft were rebuilt in the factory by AESL and issued with NZ serial numbers which accounts for some duplication.

AESL delivery pilot Cliff Tait used an Airtourer, ZK-CXU Miss Jacy, for a record breaking flight, circumnavigating the globe between May and August 1969 and covering 53,097 km in 288 flying hours. Miss Jacy is now on display at the MOTAT museum in Auckland

The Australian Certificates of Type Approval for the Victa Air Tourer 100 and 115 are now held by the Airtourer Cooperative Ltd of New South Wales, Australia.

Some 90 aircraft remain in Australia with around 20 or so elsewhere, mainly in New Zealand and the United Kingdom.

Design notes
VH-MVA was later re-engined and was the first Airtourer 115 around 1963. As for FMM, it is owned by the Museum of Victoria having last been displayed at the Australian Naval Aviation Museum in Nowra, NSW.

The Air Tourer was produced with a 'square hand grip' on the centrally-located control stick.

Variants
AESL produced 7 Airtourers from parts provided by Victa, before launching production of its own aircraft, ultimately produced in 7 different variants:
T1 powered by a 100 hp Continental O-200 engine
T2 powered by a 115 hp Lycoming O-235 engine
T3 powered by a 130 hp Rolls-Royce O-240 engine
T4 powered by a 150 hp Lycoming O-320-E1A – fixed-pitch propeller
T5 powered by a 150 hp Lycoming O-320-E1A – constant speed propeller
T6 initially a small run of 4 aircraft for the RNZAF, powered by a 150 hp Lycoming O-320-E1A – constant speed propeller with gross weight increased from T-5, and with a 24 volt electrical system.
T8 powered by a 160 hp Lycoming AEIO-320 with fuel injection.

The T7 was offered as a T6 with fixed-pitch propeller, but no orders were received for this configuration.

Operators

Military operators

Bangladesh Air Force – 3 aircraft

Royal Thai Police – One aircraft
 
Tonga Defence Services Air Wing – One aircraft

Specifications (Victa Airtourer AT.115)

Gallery

References

Ewing, Ross and MacPherson, Ross The History of New Zealand Aviation, Heinemann, 1986
Knowles, Alan, New Zealand Aircraft, IPL Books, Wellington, 1990
Mondey, David, Encyclopedia of The World's Commercial and Private Aircraft, Crescent Books, New York NY (1981). p. 244.
Taylor, John W. R. Jane's All The World's Aircraft 1966–67. London: Sampson Low, Marston & Company, 1966.

External links

The Airtourer Association Inc, Australia

RAAF CT-4s

1950s Australian civil utility aircraft
Single-engine aircraft
Aircraft first flown in 1959